Günter Haumer (born 1973) is an Austrian operatic baritone. Since 2012, he has been a member of Ensembles of the Vienna Volksoper.

Life 
Born in Vienna, Haumer completed his education at the University of Music and Performing Arts Vienna first in clarinet and piano. This was followed by studies in singing at the same place and at the Royal College of Music in London.

Haumer has performed roles in numerous countries in Europe and South America such as the lead in Don Giovanni, Il Conte Almaviva in Le nozze di Figaro, Giorgio Germont in La Traviata, Ping in Turandot, Don Alfonso in Così fan tutte, Malatesta in Don Pasquale, Danilo in The Merry Widow, Dr. Falke in Die Fledermaus, Aeneas in Dido and Aeneas. He has also appeared in contemporary operas, as Jesus in Jonathan Harvey's Passion and Resurrection and as Amfortas in Mea culpa by Christoph Schlingensief. Haumer has sung under the direction of Gustavo Dudamel, Ivor Bolton, Jesús López Cobos, Fabio Luisi, Peter Schreier, Kristjan Järvi, Sylvain Cambreling, Martin Haselböck and Erwin Ortner.

In 2016 and 2017, he performed as soloist at the gala "Christmas in Vienna" alongside Juan Diego Flórez, Anne Sofie von Otter and Olga Peretyatko. 

Haumer teaches singing at the University of Music and Performing Arts Vienna.

Discography 
Numerous CD and DVD recordings on labels such as Deutsche Grammophon, Hyperion, cpo as well as radio and television broadcasts have been issued. For example, a Lied CD with works by Richard Strauss, accompanied by Roger Vignoles, was released by Hyperion records in the anniversary year.

References

External links 
 
 Gunter Haumer on Operabase
 

Swiss operatic baritones
1973 births
Living people
Musicians from Vienna